Green Cheese was a British-made radar-guided anti-ship tactical nuclear warhead missile project of the 1950s.  Green Cheese arose as part of the 'Sverdlov crisis', when the Royal Navy were concerned over the appearance of a new Soviet heavy cruiser class. It was a longer-ranged and guided replacement for the unguided Red Angel, which had required an approach by the attacker too close to be considered survivable.

It was developed by Fairey Aviation to be used by the Fairey Gannet shipborne anti-submarine warfare aircraft, and was originally called Fairey Project 7. However, the missile's 3,800 lb (1720 kg) weight proved to be too heavy for the Gannet, and would have required  modifications to the Gannet's bomb bay to expose the missiles' seeker heads to the target before launch. The missile project continued, since the Blackburn Buccaneer naval strike aircraft had a rotating bomb bay which was ideally suited to the task.

The project was cancelled in 1956 due in part to cost over-runs, at which point it had a reached a stage called Cockburn Cheese (after the British military scientist Dr. Robert Cockburn), and was replaced with the Green Flash project. This too was cancelled and the idea of a tactical nuclear-tipped guided missile for anti-shipping use was given up in favour of a simple "lobbed" tactical nuclear bomb, the WE.177A.

The name was randomly generated as one of the UK's Rainbow Codes.

References 

Cold War anti-ship missiles of the United Kingdom
Nuclear air-to-surface missiles
Abandoned military projects of the United Kingdom